The phrase pathetic fallacy is a literary term for the attribution of human emotion and conduct to things found in nature that are not human. It is a kind of personification that occurs in poetic descriptions, when, for example, clouds seem sullen, when leaves dance, or when rocks seem indifferent. The British cultural critic John Ruskin coined the term in the third volume of his work Modern Painters (1856).

History of the phrase
Ruskin coined the term pathetic fallacy to define the sentimentality that was common to the poetry of the late 18th century, and which was rampant among poets including Burns, Blake, Wordsworth, Shelley, and Keats. Wordsworth supported this use of personification based on emotion by claiming that "objects ... derive their influence not from properties inherent in them . . . but from such as are bestowed upon them by the minds of those who are conversant with or affected by these objects." However Tennyson, in his own poetry, began to refine and diminish such expressions, and introduced an emphasis on what might be called a more scientific comparison of objects in terms of sense perception. The old order was beginning to be replaced by the new just as Ruskin addressed the matter, and the use of the pathetic fallacy markedly began to disappear. As a critic, Ruskin proved influential and is credited with having helped to refine poetic expression.

The meaning of the term has changed significantly from the idea Ruskin had in mind. Ruskin's original definition is 'emotional falseness', or the falseness that occurs to one's perceptions when influenced by violent or heightened emotion. For example, when a person is unhinged by grief, the clouds might seem darker than they are, or perhaps mournful or perhaps even uncaring.

There have been other changes to Ruskin's phrase since he coined it: The particular definition that Ruskin used for the word fallacy has since become obsolete. The word nowadays is defined as an example of flawed reasoning, but for Ruskin and writers of the 19th century and earlier, fallacy could be used to mean simply a 'falseness'. In the same way, the word pathetic simply meant for Ruskin "emotional" or "pertaining to emotion."

Setting aside Ruskin's original intentions, and despite this linguistic "rocky road," the two-word phrase has survived, though with a significantly altered meaning.

Examples of Ruskin's original meaning

In his essay, Ruskin demonstrates his original meaning by offering lines of a poem:

They rowed her in across the rolling foam—
The cruel, crawling foam . . .

Ruskin then points out that "the foam is not cruel, neither does it crawl. The state of mind which attributes to it these characters of a living creature is one in which the reason is unhinged by grief"—yet, Ruskin did not disapprove of this use of the pathetic fallacy:

Now, so long as we see that the feeling is true, we pardon, or are even pleased by, the confessed fallacy of sight, which it induces: we are pleased, for instance, with those lines . . . above quoted, not because they fallaciously describe foam, but because they faithfully describe sorrow.

Ruskin intended that pathetic fallacy may also refer to any untrue description: as in the description of a crocus as "gold," when the flower is, according to Ruskin, saffron in colour.

The following, a stanza from the poem "Maud" (1855) by Alfred, Lord Tennyson, demonstrates what John Ruskin, in Modern Painters, said was an "exquisite" instance of the use of the pathetic fallacy:

There has fallen a splendid tear
  From the passion-flower at the gate.
She is coming, my dove, my dear;
  She is coming, my life, my fate.
The red rose cries, "She is near, she is near;"
  And the white rose weeps, "She is late;"
The larkspur listens, "I hear, I hear;"
  And the lily whispers, "I wait." (Part 1, XXII, 10)

Science
In science, the term pathetic fallacy is used in a pejorative way in order to discourage the kind of figurative speech in descriptions that might not be strictly accurate and clear, and that might communicate a false impression of a natural phenomenon. An example is the metaphorical phrase "nature abhors a vacuum," which contains the suggestion that nature is capable of abhorring something. There are more accurate and scientific ways to describe nature and vacuums.

Another example of a pathetic fallacy is the expression, "Air hates to be crowded, and, when compressed, it will try to escape to an area of lower pressure." It is not accurate to suggest that air "hates" anything or "tries" to do anything. Air does not have an intent. Thus, the fallacy is assigning a mental state to an inanimate object that does not have one. One way to express the ideas that underlie that phrase in a more scientific manner can be found and described in the kinetic theory of gases: effusion or movement towards lower pressure occurs because unobstructed gas molecules will become more evenly distributed between high- and low-pressure zones, by a flow from the former to the latter.

See also

 Animism
 Anthropocentrism
 Anthropomorphism
 Figure of speech
 Morgan's Canon
 List of narrative techniques
 Hypallage

References

Further reading 
 Abrams, M. H. A Glossary of Literary Terms, 7th edition. Fort Worth, Texas: Harcourt Brace College Publishers, 1999. .
 Groden, Michael, and Martin Kreiswirth (eds.). The Johns Hopkins Guide to Literary Theory and Criticism. Baltimore: Johns Hopkins University Press, 1994. .
 Ruskin, J., "Of the Pathetic Fallacy", Modern Painters Vol. III (1856).

1843 introductions
Anthropomorphism
Figures of speech
Literary criticism
Neologisms
1850s neologisms